Günther Edmund Maul (May 7, 1909 – September 28, 1997) was a German ichthyologist and taxidermist in Portugal. Maul came to Madeira in December 1930 to work as taxidermist at Museu Municipal do Funchal, which opened to the public in 1933. He was appointed director for the museum in 1940, a post that he held to his retirement in 1979. He, however, continued his research until shortly before his death. He started two journals (Boletim do Museu Municipal do Funchal in 1945 and Bocagiana in 1959) and opened the museum's aquarium to the public in 1959. He also participated in several expeditions including with the French bathyscaphe Archimède in 1966 and organised the first multidisciplinary expedition to the Salvage Islands in 1963. He was awarded an honorary doctorate from the University of Madeira in 1995.

Works
He described several species of fish
Himantolophus albinares 
Coryphaenoides thelestomus
Macruronus maderensis
Rouleina maderensis 
Argyripnus atlanticus

Taxon described by him
See :Category:Taxa named by Günther Maul

Taxon named in his honor 
Maul has at least three species and one genus of fish 
Himantolophus mauli Bertelsen & Krefft, 1988 
Pollichthys mauli (Poll, 1953)
Maulisia mauli Parr, 1960), 
Mauligobius
one fossil owl (Otus mauli) 
and one moth (Acrolepiopsis mauli) named in his honour.

References
Biographical facts are taken from: Manuel José Biscoito, GÜNTHER EDMUND MAUL (Frankfurt, 1909 – Funchal, 1997)

External links
 Museu de História Natural do Funchal, in Portuguese.

German ichthyologists
Portuguese zoologists
1909 births
1997 deaths
20th-century German zoologists
Recipients of the Order of Merit of the Federal Republic of Germany